Ancylosis namibiella is a species of snout moth in the genus Ancylosis. It was described by Boris Balinsky in 1987 and is known from Namibia and South Africa.

References

Moths described in 1987
namibiella
Insects of Namibia
Moths of Africa